The 2017–18 daytime network television schedule for four of the five major English-language commercial broadcast networks in the United States covers the weekday daytime hours from September 2017 to August 2018. The schedule is followed by a list per network of returning series, and any series canceled after the 2016–17 season.

Affiliates fill time periods not occupied by network programs with local or syndicated programming. PBS – which offers daytime programming through a children's program block, PBS Kids – is not included, as its member television stations have local flexibility over most of their schedules and broadcast times for network shows may vary. Also not included are stations affiliated with Fox (as the network does not air a daytime network schedule or network news), MyNetworkTV (as the programming service also does not offer daytime programs of any kind), and Ion Television (as its schedule consists mainly of syndicated reruns).

Legend

 New series are highlighted in bold.

Schedule
 All times correspond to U.S. Eastern and Pacific Time scheduling (except for some live sports or events). Except where affiliates slot certain programs outside their network-dictated timeslots, subtract one hour for Central, Mountain, Alaska, and Hawaii-Aleutian times.
 Local schedules may differ, as affiliates have the option to pre-empt or delay network programs. Such scheduling may be limited to preemptions caused by local or national breaking news or weather coverage (which may force stations to tape delay certain programs in overnight timeslots or defer them to a co-operated station or digital subchannel in their regular timeslot) and any major sports events scheduled to air in a weekday timeslot (mainly during major holidays). Stations may air shows at other times at their preference.

Monday-Friday

Notes:
 CBS owned-and-operated and affiliate stations have the option of airing Let's Make a Deal at either 10:00 a.m. or 3:00 p.m. Eastern, depending on the station's choice of feed.
 (*) - While Megyn Kelly Today and Kathie Lee & Hoda are technically considered part of Today, they are also promoted as their own distinct programs.
 ‡ The Chew aired its last original episode on June 15; reruns of the program would continue to air until September 7, 2018.
 † The Robert Irvine Show aired its last original episode on May 25; reruns of the program would continue to air until September 7, 2018. Its replacement would be reruns of The Jerry Springer Show, which ended production after the 2017–18 season.

Saturday

Sunday

By network

ABC

Returning series:
ABC World News Tonight
The Chew
General Hospital
Good Morning America
The View

CBS

Returning series:
The Bold and the Beautiful
CBS Evening News
CBS This Morning
Let's Make a Deal
The Price is Right
The Talk
The Young and the Restless

The CW

Returning series:
The Robert Irvine Show

NBC

Returning series:
Days of Our Lives
NBC Nightly News
Today
Megyn Kelly Today
Kathie Lee & Hoda
The More You KnowThe Voyager with Josh GarciaThe Champion Within with Lauren ThompsonGiveWilderness Vet with Dr. OakleyJourney with Dylan DreyerNaturally, Danny SeoNew series:The More You Know
Health + Happiness with Mayo Clinic

Renewals and cancellations

Series renewals

CBS
 The Bold and the Beautiful—Renewed for a 31st season on June 20, 2017.
 Let's Make a Deal—Renewed for a ninth season on June 20, 2017.
 The Price is Right—Renewed for a 48th and 49th season on June 20, 2017.
 The Talk—Renewed for an eighth season on June 20, 2017.
 The Young and the Restless—Renewed for three additional seasons (encompassing its 44th, 45th and 46th seasons) on June 20, 2017.

NBC
 Days of Our Lives—Renewed for a 52nd season (running through September 2018) on February 21, 2017.

Cancellations/series endings

ABC
 The Chew—Canceled on May 23, 2018; the series concluded with its last first-run episode on June 28, 2018 with repeats continuing until September 7.

The CW
 The Robert Irvine Show—Its last original episode aired on May 24, 2018; cancellation was formally announced on June 13, 2018.

See also
2017–18 United States network television schedule (prime-time)
2017–18 United States network television schedule (late night)

References

Sources
 
 
 

United States weekday network television schedules
2017 in American television
2018 in American television